Silvio Arango Betancourt (born June 22, 1988) is a Colombian former footballer.

Titles
 La Equidad 2008 (Copa Colombia)

References
 
 

1988 births
Living people
Colombian footballers
Colombian expatriate footballers
Once Caldas footballers
La Equidad footballers
S.D. Aucas footballers
Sportivo Trinidense footballers
Expatriate footballers in Ecuador
Expatriate footballers in Paraguay
Association football midfielders